Twisted Fate may refer to:

Twisted Fate, a 1993 film by Randall Frakes
"Twisted Fate", a song on the 2010 album Into the Great Beyond
"Twisted Fate", a 2013 episode of Japanese television series Terrace House: Boys × Girls Next Door
Twisted Fate, a 2014 short story collection by Traci Hunter Abramson and two other authors
"Twisted Fate", a 2017 episode of South Korean television series The Lady in Dignity
"Twisted Fate", a 2020 episode of Philippine television series Prima Donnas
 Twisted Fate, the Card Master, a character in League of Legends

See also
Twist of Fate (disambiguation)